Unwrapped, also known as Unwrapped with Marc Summers, is an American television program on Food Network that reveals the origins of sponsored foods. It first aired in June 2001 and is hosted by Marc Summers. The show leads viewers on tours of factories and other food-related locations. Popular subjects include candy, breakfast cereal, snacks, and TV dinners. The show's spin-off, Trivia Unwrapped, is a game show also hosted by Marc Summers. In February 2015, a revival series, Unwrapped 2.0, began airing; it's hosted by Alfonso Ribeiro.

Overview
The show tapes segments with Marc Summers at many different locations across the country.  Some host segment locations are: The Notz Landing Diner located in Golden, Colorado at the Heritage Square Amusement Park; The Drugstore in Pueblo, Colorado; locations within Elitch Gardens Amusement Park in Denver; and a specially built set at the Comcast Media Center near Denver.

The show is produced by the Colorado production company High Noon Productions for Food Network. Since 2006, new episodes of Unwrapped have been presented in high definition on Food Network HD.

Volume 1 of the show has been released to a three-DVD set.

Marc Silverstein hosted several 1-hour Unwrapped specials (later remade with Summers).

Episodes

References

External links
 
 

2001 American television series debuts
2011 American television series endings
2000s American cooking television series
2010s American cooking television series
English-language television shows
Food Network original programming
American television series revived after cancellation